Pteroteinon caenira, the white-banded red-eye, is a butterfly in the family Hesperiidae. It is found in Guinea, Sierra Leone, Liberia, Ivory Coast, Ghana, Nigeria, Cameroon, Gabon, the Republic of the Congo, the Central African Republic, the Democratic Republic of the Congo, Uganda and north-western Zambia. The habitat consists of forests and dense secondary growth.

Adults have been recorded mud-puddling.

The larvae feed on Phoenix dactylifera and Washingtonia filifera.

References

Butterflies described in 1867
Erionotini
Butterflies of Africa
Taxa named by William Chapman Hewitson